In mathematical invariant theory, an evectant is a contravariant constructed from an invariant by acting on it with a differential operator called an  evector.

References

Invariant theory